The Kentucky–Indiana League was a minor league baseball league which operated in Kentucky and Indiana in . The league had six teams in their lone season. Former Major League Baseball players who participated in the league were Frank Freund, Sammy Strang, Bob Langsford and Charlie Knepper.

1896 teams
Evansville, Indiana: Evansville Hoosiers 
Henderson, Kentucky: Henderson 
Hopkinsville, Kentucky: Hopkinsville 
Madisonville, Kentucky: Madisonville 
Owensboro, Kentucky: Owensboro Corncrackers
Vincennes, Indiana: Vincennes 
Washington, Indiana: Washington Giants

1896 Kentucky-Indiana League standings
 
The league started June 22 with Evansville, Henderson, Owensboro and Vincennes. When the Vincennes franchise folded, the Hopkinsville, Madisonville and Washington teams were added and the league restarted July 1.Madisonville disbanded July 29; Henderson disbanded August 3; Evansville disbanded August 4

References

External links
Baseball-Reference (Minors)

Defunct minor baseball leagues in the United States
Baseball leagues in Indiana
Baseball leagues in Kentucky
Sports leagues established in 1896
Sports leagues disestablished in 1896